Rita Lau Ng Wai-lan  (born 8 May 1953) is a Hong Kong former civil servant. She was appointed Secretary for Commerce and Economic Development in July 2008 after her predecessor Frederick Ma resigned due to health reasons. Coincidentally, ill-health also forced her resignation from this position on 8 April 2011, following an operation to remove a colon tumour.

Civil Service 

Mrs Lau joined as Hong Kong Civil Service in 1976. She has served in various bureaux and departments in the government. She was Deputy Secretary for Information Technology and Broadcasting (1998), Director of Urban Services (1999), Director of Food and Environmental Hygiene (2000), Permanent Secretary for the Environment, Transport and Works (Environment and Transport) (July 2002–January 2004) and Permanent Secretary for Housing, Planning and Lands (Planning and Lands) (May 2004–July 2007), and Permanent Secretary for Commerce and Economic Development (Communications and Technology) (July 2007–July 2008). She trained at Tsinghua University in Beijing between January and April, 2004.

She has been Chairman of the Public Service Commission since May 2014.

References 
Precedence information sourced from the Government's May 2017 HKSAR Precedence List.

External links 
Mrs Rita Lau Ng Wai-lan, JP, Secretary for Commerce and Economic Development

1953 births
Living people
Alumni of the University of Hong Kong
Government officials of Hong Kong